Shahi Kangri is a mountain peak located at 6,934m (22,749ft) above sea level in the far west of the Transhimalaya.

Location 
The peak is located in the Shyok catchment area, west of Aksai Chin (China) in the Leh district of Union territory of Ladakh (India).

Climbing history 
In 2017, a climbing attempt was made by Divyesh Muni, his wife Vineeta Muni, Rajesh Gadgil, Dinesh Koday, Ratnesh, and Roshmin Mahendru. But it was not successful.

On 23 June 2022, an 55 men Indian Army expedition team, led by Brigadier Saurabh Singh Shekhawat, successfully scaled the climb to Shahi kangri.

References 

Mountains of the Transhimalayas
Six-thousanders of the Transhimalayas
Mountains of Ladakh